Bad Elements is a book about contemporary Chinese history by Ian Buruma, published by Random House on  November 20, 2001. The book's subtitle, Chinese Rebels from Los Angeles to Beijing, indicates the main focus of the book.

Bad Elements is divided into three parts: The Exiles, Greater China and the Motherland.

References

2001 non-fiction books
21st-century history books
History books about China